The Yoy people are an ethnic group in Southeast Asia.

Other names and spellings
Tai Jo
Tai Yo
Tai Yoi
Tai Yoy
Dioi
Giy
Yooi
Yuai
Lao Yuai
Duoi
Yoe
Yooy

Geographic Distribution
Population of 1,300 in Khammouan Province of Laos
Population of 6,000 in Thailand
Population of 800 in Vietnam

Religions
Theravada Buddhism (with Animism influence)

Ethnic groups in Laos
Ethnic groups in Vietnam
Ethnic groups in Thailand